Alexander "Sasha" Chmelevski (born June 9, 1999) is an American professional ice hockey forward for Salavat Yulaev Ufa of the Kontinental Hockey League (KHL). He was selected by the San Jose Sharks in the 2017 NHL Entry Draft, and made his NHL debut in 2021.

Playing career
Chmelevski played major junior in the Ontario Hockey League for four seasons. In 2015 the Sarnia Sting selected him 10th overall in the OHL Priority Selection. He joined the Sting, but was traded midway through his first season to the Ottawa 67's. He played three and a half seasons with Ottawa. At the 2017 NHL Entry Draft Chmelevski was selected 185th overall by the San Jose Sharks. He signed an entry level contract with the Sharks on April 3, 2018.

In 2018 Chmelevski made his professional debut, playing six regular season games and a further four in the playoffs with the Sharks' American Hockey League affiliate, the San Jose Barracuda. He played one season with the Barracuda in 2019–20 season, cut short due to COVID-19.

He made his NHL debut on February 5, 2021, in a 5–4 shootout win over the Anaheim Ducks, recording an assist.

As a restricted free agent from the Sharks following the  season, Chmelevski opted to sign abroad in agreeing to a one-year contract with Russian club, Salavat Yulaev Ufa of the KHL, on July 26, 2022.

Personal life
Chmelevski is of Ukrainian ancestry and his family resides in Northville, Michigan since he was aged 12. Until then, he grew up in California, practicing at the KHS Ice Arena in Anaheim.

Career statistics

Regular season and playoffs

International

Awards and honors

References

External links
 

1999 births
Living people
American ice hockey centers
American people of Ukrainian descent
Ice hockey players from California
Ottawa 67's players
Salavat Yulaev Ufa players
San Jose Barracuda players
San Jose Sharks draft picks
San Jose Sharks players
Sarnia Sting players
Sportspeople from Huntington Beach, California